Sundanese Supplement is a Unicode block containing punctuation characters for Sundanese.

History
The following Unicode-related documents record the purpose and process of defining specific characters in the Sundanese Supplement block:

References 

Unicode blocks
Sundanese script